Tropodiaptomus madagascariensis is a species of calanoid copepod in the family Diaptomidae.

The IUCN conservation status of Tropodiaptomus madagascariensis is "DD", data deficient, risk undetermined. The IUCN status was reviewed in 1996.

Subspecies
These two subspecies belong to the species Tropodiaptomus madagascariensis:
 Tropodiaptomus madagascariensis madagascariensis
 Tropodiaptomus madagascariensis poseidon (Brehm, 1952)

References

Diaptomidae
Articles created by Qbugbot
Crustaceans described in 1918